Crawford Township is a township in Madison County, Iowa, in the United States.

History
Crawford Township was named for Oliver Crawford, a pioneer settler who came from Ohio.

References

Townships in Madison County, Iowa
Townships in Iowa